Mineola Downtown Historic District is located in Mineola, Texas.  Most of the buildings in the district were built between
1885 and 1960.  The district comprises 88 properties and covers almost 23 acres.

It was added to the National Register on April 16, 2013.

Photo gallery

See also

National Register of Historic Places listings in Wood County, Texas
Recorded Texas Historic Landmarks in Wood County

References

External links

Historic districts on the National Register of Historic Places in Texas
Geography of Wood County, Texas
National Register of Historic Places in Wood County, Texas